Sir Thomas Dale ( 1570 − 19 August 1619) was an English naval commander and deputy-governor of the Virginia Colony in 1611 and from 1614 to 1616. Governor Dale is best remembered for the energy and the extreme rigour of his administration in Virginia, which established order and in various ways seems to have benefited the colony, although he was criticised for high-handedness. He is also credited with the establishment of Bermuda Hundred, Bermuda Cittie, and the Cittie of Henricus.

Biography

Early career
From about 1588 to 1609, Thomas Dale was in the service of the Low Countries (the Netherlands and parts of modern Belgium) with the English army originally under Robert Dudley, Earl of Leicester. Because of his ability and ambition, he became friends with many people in positions of authority. In 1599 Thomas Dale was recruited by the Earl of Essex for England's army, and was knighted by King James to become "Sir Thomas Dale of Surry" on 16 June 1606.

While Dale was still serving in the Low Countries, on the recommendation of the eldest son of King James, Henry Frederick, Prince of Wales, the States-General of the United Netherlands consented "that Captain Thomas Dale (destined by the King of Great Britain to be employed in Virginia in his Majesty's service) may absent himself from his company for the space of three years, and that his said company shall remain meanwhile vacant, to be resumed by him if he think proper."

Leading the Virginia Colony
Five years later, the Virginia Company of London sent Sir Thomas Dale to act as deputy-governor or as "Marshall of Virginia" (a new position) for the Virginia Colony under the authority of Thomas West, 3rd Baron De La Warr (Lord Delaware). Sent with three ships, on 19 May 1611, he arrived at Jamestown (named after King James) with men, cattle, and provisions. He found the conditions unhealthy and greatly in need of improvement. Dale immediately called for a meeting of the Jamestown Council and established crews to rebuild Jamestown.

He served as acting Governor for 3½  months in 1611 and again for a two-year period between 1614 and 1616. In the interim, he served as the Marshall of the colony, initially serving directly under Deputy Governor Sir Thomas Gates. Effectively, for five years, he was the highest ranking law enforcement officer in Virginia. He exhibited a certain stern efficiency which was perhaps the best support and medicine that could have been devised. 

It was during his administration that the first code of laws of Virginia,  nominally in force from 1611 to 1619, was effectively tested. This code, entitled "Articles, Lawes, and Orders Divine, Politique, and Martiall" (popularly known as Dale's Code), was notable for its pitiless severity and seems to have been prepared in large part by Dale himself.

Perhaps Dale's most lasting reform was economic. In 1613, without stockholder consent, Dale abandoned the communal agriculture which had proved unsatisfactory, and he assigned 3-acre (12,000 m2) plots to its "ancient planters" and smaller plots to the settlement's later arrivals. Measurable economic progress was made, and the settlers began expanding their planting to land belonging to local native tribes. Not only did food production increase markedly, but the following year John Rolfe succeeded on his plot in raising the first hybrid tobacco − the key to the colony's future.

Seeking a better site than Jamestown, Thomas Dale sailed up the James River (also named after King James) to the area now known as Chesterfield County. 
He was apparently impressed with the possibilities of the general area where the Appomattox River joins the James River, and there are published references to the name "New Bermuda" although it apparently was never formalised. (Far from the mainland of North America, the archipelago of Bermuda had been established as part of the Virginia Colony in 1612 following the shipwreck of the Sea Venture in 1609.)

A short distance further up the James, in 1611, he began the construction of a progressive development at Henricus on and about what was later known as Farrars Island. Henricus was envisioned as possible replacement capital for Jamestown and was to have the first college in Virginia. (The ill-fated Henricus was destroyed during the Indian Massacre of 1622, during which a third of the colonists were killed.) 

In addition to creating the new settlement at Henricus, Dale also established the port town of Bermuda Hundred and "Bermuda Cittie" (sic). He began the excavation work at Dutch Gap, using methods he had learned while serving in Holland.

In 1614, Governor Thomas Dale sent 20 men, under Lieutenant William Craddock, to the area across the Chesapeake Bay from mainland Virginia now known as the Eastern Shore to establish a salt works and to catch fish for the colonists. They intended to make salt by boiling down the sea water. They settled along Old Plantation Creek at a place named "Dale's Gift" on the mainland, but they established the salt works on Smith Island, which is located adjacent to the southern portion of the Eastern Shore in present-day Northampton County near Cape Charles.

Return to England
 
Governor Dale sailed back to England in the spring of 1616 aboard the Treasurer. Accompanying him on what was considered an investor-relations journey were John Rolfe, his wife Rebecca (Pocahontas), and their one-year-old son, Thomas Rolfe. Samuel Argall commanded that ship. Queen Anne and others were reportedly charmed by Rebecca, and investment in the Virginia Company was enhanced. However, soon after leaving London, as John Rolfe and his wife sailed down the Thames River, Rebecca became very ill and died on 21 March 1617 before returning to Virginia. In December that year, Sir Henry Savile wrote to the courtier Sir Dudley Carleton, recommending Dale for office, following his service in Virginia.

In 1618, Dale was appointed commander of a squadron of six ships, which the East India Company sent out in April to maintain their interests against the aggressive policy of the Dutch and for the relief of Nathaniel Courthope, who was reportedly beleaguered on the island of Run. Dale arrived at Bantam in November 1618, and on 23 December he engaged the Dutch fleet off Jacatra (now Jakarta). After a sharp action, he put it to flight and laid siege to the Dutch fort at Jacatra, in the swamps around which he seems to have contracted the sickness of which, in the course of the following summer, he died at Masulipatnam in India.

Legacy
Thomas Dale High School in Chesterfield County, Virginia is named after him.
The Dale Magisterial District of Chesterfield County is also named in his honor.
Due to the severity of his legal regime, Governor Dale appears as one of the "jury of the damned" in the 1937 short story, The Devil and Daniel Webster. The story alleges that Dale "broke men on the wheel".
Dale was voiced by Hugh Dignon in the Animated Hero Classics 1994 direct-to-video episode, Pocahontas.
Dale's Pale Archeological District includes the location of a defensive palisade built by him in 1613 around the original settlement at Bermuda Hundred.
John and Rebecca/Pocahontas Rolfe's only son Thomas was named after him.

References

Sources

Further reading
Scarboro, D. Dewey  The Establisher: The Story of Sir Thomas Dale, Old Mountain Press, Fayetteville, NC  http://www.oldmp.com/SirThomasDale.htm
Games, Alison The Web of Empire: English Cosmopolitans in an Age of Empire, 1560-1660, Oxford University Press, 2008. 

James River (Virginia)
Colonial governors of Virginia
1619 deaths
Year of birth unknown
English emigrants
Knights Bachelor